Jacob Wit (born 24 December 1952, in Haarlemmermeer) is a justice of the Caribbean Court of Justice, located in Trinidad and Tobago. Since 2010 he also serves as the President of the Constitutional Court of Sint Maarten, and is a former Judge of the Rotterdam District Court and the Common Court of Justice of the Netherlands Antilles and Aruba.

Early life and legal career 

Wit (Netherlands Antilles) was born on 24 December 1952 in Haarlemmermeer, Netherlands.

He graduated from the Pius X Lyceum (Amsterdam) in 1971, entering in that same year the Vrije Universiteit (Free University) of Amsterdam, from which he took the degree of Master of Laws with honours in 1977. After completing his military service (1976-1978) as a Second Lieutenant in the Royal Dutch Navy. Wit was admitted in March 1978 as a Judicial Trainee at the Studiecentrum Rechtspleging (Training and Study Centre for the Judiciary) in Zutphen, where he remained until 1984. During this period, he held the posts of Law Clerk in the Rotterdam District Court, Rotterdam, (1978-1980) and Deputy Prosecutor at the Amsterdam District Court (1980-1982) and worked as an attorney-at-law with the Law Firm of Van Doorne & Sjollema in Rotterdam.

Judicial career 

Wit was appointed as Deputy Judge of the Rotterdam District Court in January 1984, Judge of the Netherlands Antilles and Aruba on 1 October 1986 where he functioned as Coordinating Judge, Court of First Instance, Curaçao (1993-1996); Coordinator Judge of Instruction, Netherlands Antilles (1994-1997); Coordinating Judge for the Dutch Windward Islands of Sint Maarten, Sint Eustatius and Saba and from 2001 to 2005 as Senior Justice and Acting Chief Justice.
He took the Oath of Office as a Judge of the Caribbean Court of Justice (CCJ) at the President’s House Port of Spain, on Wednesday 1 June 2005. In November 2010, Wit was appointed and sworn in as the President of the Constitutional Court of Sint Maarten, a part-time function.

References 

1952 births
Living people
Caribbean Court of Justice judges
20th-century Dutch judges
People from Haarlemmermeer
Dutch judges of international courts and tribunals
21st-century Dutch judges